Jealousy is a 1916 American silent drama film written and directed by Will S. Davis. The film starred Valeska Suratt in another popular vamp role. The film is now considered lost.

Cast
 Valeska Suratt - Anne Baxter
 Lew Walter - Peter Martin
 Charline Mayfield - Agnes Maynard
 Curtis Benton - Roland Carney
 Joseph Granby - Randolp Parsons
 George M. Adams - George Baxter
 John Charles (uncredited)
 Herbert Heyes (uncredited)
 Claire Whitney (uncredited)

References

External links
 
 

1916 films
1916 drama films
Fox Film films
Silent American drama films
American silent feature films
American black-and-white films
Films directed by Will S. Davis
Lost American films
1916 lost films
Lost drama films
1910s American films